The Flower of Kent is a green cultivar of cooking apple. According to the story, this is the apple Isaac Newton saw falling to ground from its tree, inspiring his laws of universal gravitation. It is pear-shaped, mealy, and sub-acid, and of generally poor quality by today's standards. As its name suggests, this cultivar likely originated from Kent, England.

Though now largely gone from commercial cultivation, a handful of Flower of Kent trees remain.  Most, if not all, are said to descend from trees at Newton's Woolsthorpe Manor, and nearly all currently in existence descend from a single tree in East Malling, Kent. One such tree is located in the President's Garden at MIT, although it is known to have produced only one apple. Currently, this cultivar remains available at Antique Apple Orchard Inc. in Sweet Home, Oregon.

The National Fruit Collection at Brogdale contains an example, listed as "Isaac Newton's Tree" (1948-729).

References

External links 
 A Brief History of Isaac Newton’s Apple Tree
 Isaac Newton’s Apple Tree at Woolsthorpe Manor

Isaac Newton
British apples
Apple cultivars